Bill Joass was an Australian professional rugby league footballer who played in the 1930s. He played one season for Canterbury-Bankstown of the New South Wales Rugby League Premiership.

Playing career 
Joass had a brief career in the NSWRL with little team success. He made his debut for Canterbury in Round 2 of 1935 - only the club's second game in history. He started at wing, with his side losing badly to the South Sydney Rabbitohs 37-9. He played 3 more consecutive games, before finishing his career 5 rounds into the season's start. In Round 5, Joass played the final game of his career in a record-breaking 6-91 loss to the St. George Dragons. This still stands as the largest winning margin (85) in a game in the history of the NSWRL/NRL.

Joass concluded his career with four appearances and no points. All four games he played were losses.

References 

Canterbury-Bankstown Bulldogs players
New South Wales rugby league team players
Australian rugby league players
Rugby league players from New South Wales